"Negai" is Fayray's 15th single and first on the R&C Japan record label. It was released on February 18, 2004 and peaked at #22 on the charts. The song was used as the theme song for the Yomiuri TV/Nippon TV series drama "Ranpo R". The coupling is a cover of Dusty Springfield's "Spooky".

Track listing
願い (Negai; Wish)
Spooky

Charts
"Negai" - Oricon Sales Chart (Japan)

External links
Fayray official website

2004 singles
Fayray songs
Japanese television drama theme songs
2004 songs
Songs written by Fayray